Acacia capillaris is a shrub belonging to the genus Acacia and the subgenus Lycopodiifoliae that is endemic to small area in north western Australia.

Description
Like most species of Acacia it has phyllodes rather than true leaves. They are arranged in whorls containing 14 to 18 erect evergreen phyllodes. It blooms in May and produces yellow flowers. The spherical flower-heads contain 15 to 20 flowers. The pods contain two to eight seeds that are arranged longitudinally.

Taxonomy
The species was first formally described by the botanist Alexander Segger George in 1999 as part of the work Seven new species in Acacia section Lycopodiifolia (Mimosaceae) as published in the Journal of the Royal Society of Western Australia. It was reclassified as Racosperma capillare in 2003 by Leslie Pedley then transferred back to genusAcacia in 2006.
The type specimen was collected by R.J.Cranfield in 1988 from around Fern Creek in the Wunaamin-Miliwundi Ranges.

Distribution
It is native to an area in the Kimberley region of Western Australia where it is commonly situated on steep rocky slopes or along creek lines growing in clay soils. It is found around Mount Bell and Scott Gorge in the West Kimberley region growing in red-brown clay soils often over granite and is an understory plant commonly situated beneath Livistona palms as a part of savannah or spinifex communities.

See also
List of Acacia species

References

capillaris
Acacias of Western Australia
Plants described in 1999
Taxa named by Alex George